Nesiergus is a genus of Seychelloise tarantulas that was first described by Eugène Louis Simon in 1903.  it contains three species, found on the Seychelles: N. gardineri, N. halophilus, and N. insulanus.

See also
 List of Theraphosidae species

References

Theraphosidae genera
Spiders of Africa
Theraphosidae